Mahmoud Yassen Soufi (20 October 1971 – 2 June 2019) was a Qatari footballer. He competed in the men's tournament at the 1992 Summer Olympics.

References

External links
 

1971 births
2019 deaths
Qatari footballers
muaither SC players
Qatar international footballers
Olympic footballers of Qatar
Qatar Stars League players
1988 AFC Asian Cup players
1992 AFC Asian Cup players
Footballers at the 1992 Summer Olympics
Place of birth missing
Association football forwards
Footballers at the 1994 Asian Games
Asian Games competitors for Qatar